Johannes de Imola (c. 1370 – 1436) was an Italian jurist, a student of Baldus de Ubaldis, Francesco Ramponi and Johannes of Lignano. He taught at Pavia, Siena and Bologna, and was one of the major commentators on the Decretals of Gregory IX

In the Western Schism, he supported the form of conciliarism that deemed the correct resolution of the schism would be for Pope Gregory XII to summon a general council.

He was a strong defender of due process.

Notes

External links
WorldCat page
CERL page
British Library ISTC page

1370 births
1436 deaths
15th-century Italian jurists
Canon law jurists